Maximilian Forster (born September 19, 1990) is a German professional ice hockey player. He is currently playing for Straubing Tigers in the Deutsche Eishockey Liga (DEL).

References

External links

1990 births
Living people
German ice hockey left wingers
Straubing Tigers players
Sportspeople from Landshut